Weavers Point is a headland to the north of the entrance to Loch Maddy, on the north eastern coastline of North Uist in the Western Isles of Scotland. There has been a lighthouse on the headland since 1980.

Lighthouse

The light is modern construction established in 1980. It is a skeletal tower covered by aluminium panels with the light on the top, the characteristic light is not available.

See also

 List of lighthouses in Scotland
 List of Northern Lighthouse Board lighthouses

References

External links
 Northern Lighthouse Board 
 Picture of Weavers Point Lighthouse

North Uist
Headlands of Scotland
Landforms of the Outer Hebrides